Francesco Giroldini is an Italian director, writer and artist working in the animation industry.

He is well known along with Brendan Carroll for his role as writer and director of the short films The Monk and The Monkey (2010) and Animation Tag Attack (2011).

His credits also include Ferdinand, Ice Age: Collision Course, Kung Fu Panda 2, Rio 2, Madagascar 3, The Peanuts Movie, Mr. Peabody and Sherman, Puss in Boots, Rise of the Guardians and Megamind, among others.

Life and career 
Giroldini was born in Milan, Italy and graduated Ringling College of Art and Design in 2010, majoring in Computer animation.

In 2010 he joined DreamWorks Animation and in 2013 he joined Blue Sky Studios.

Giroldini's first short film, The Monk and The Monkey, was released in 2010 and was featured at SIGGRAPH as well as Siggraph Asia. Giroldini's second short film, Animation Tag Attack, was released in 2011 and was featured at the Annecy Film Festival. Both short films received wide praise and critical acclaim.

In 2015 Giroldini joined the production for the animated short film Mila as a Lighting Supervisor.

In 2016 Mila was successfully crowd-funded, raising over $60,000 on Indiegogo.

Filmography 
 The Monk and The Monkey
 Animation Tag Attack
 Megamind
 Megamind: The Button of Doom
 Kung Fu Panda 2
 Night of the Living Carrots
 Puss in Boots
 Madagascar 3: Europe's Most Wanted
 Rise of the Guardians
 Mr. Peabody & Sherman
 Rio 2
 The Peanuts Movie
 Ice Age: Collision Course
 Mila
 Ferdinand
Nimona

Awards and achievements 
Giroldini has received many awards and honors for his work, which was featured at SIGGRAPH, Siggraph Asia and Annecy alongside work from established studios such as Blizzard Entertainment, Passion Pictures, Digic Pictures and Platige Image.

His work has been featured on some of the top CG magazines in the world such as 3Dtotal, Stash, Cartoon Brew and CGW.

His awards include:
The Film Skillet – Finalist, Animation Category – The Monk and the Monkey (2013)
Annecy International Animation Film Festival – Official Selection – Animation Tag Attack (2013)
Toronto Animation Arts Festival International – Official Selection – Animation Tag Attack (2013)
Tokyo Anime Award – Winner, General Category – Animation Tag Attack (2013)
International Festival of Contemporary Animation and Media Art LINOLEUM – Second Prize – Animation Tag Attack (2012)
The Danish Animation Awards – Talent of the Year – Animation Tag Attack (2012)
International Festival of Documentary and Short Film in Bilbao – The Golden MIKELDI – Animation Tag Attack (2012)
Webcuts – Best Collaborative Project – Animation Tag Attack (2011)
Malta Film Festival – Winner, Best Foreign Animation Category – The Monk and the Monkey (2011)
Siggraph – Computer Animation Festival Highlight – The Monk and the Monkey (2010)
Soul 4 Reel – Best of Show – The Monk and the Monkey (2010)
Siggraph Asia – Computer Animation Festival Highlight – The Monk and the Monkey (2010)
Bang Awards – Winner, General Category – The Monk and the Monkey (2010)
Motion TV – Winner, General Category – The Monk and the Monkey (2010)

References

External links 
http://www.ciakmagazine.it/mila-quando-lunione-globale-fa-la-forza/
http://www.editando.cl/2013/01/the-monk-and-the-monkey-cortometraje-animado.html/
http://www.focusonanimation.com/une-belle-serie-daffiches-personnages-pour-snoopy-24502/
https://www.3dtotal.com/interview/185-10-top-lighting-tips-by-poz-watson-hints-help
https://3dtotal.jp/tutorials/1747/2/
https://dzineblog.com/40-must-see-cool-short-animation-websites/
http://animatedviews.com/2016/around-the-world-with-mila-interview-with-visual-development-supervisor-cesar-alejandro-montero-orozco/
http://dl.acm.org/citation.cfm?doid=1836623.1836672
http://www.motiongraphics.it/2010/09/the-monk-the-monkey/
https://www.viewconference.it/docs/SIGGRAPH_Asia_en.pdf
http://motionographer.com/2010/12/10/the-monk-the-monkey-is-a-beautiful-story-by-brendan-carroll-francesco-giroldini/
http://loyalkng.com/2010/08/28/the-monk-the-monkey-by-brendan-carroll-francesco-giroldini-from-ringling-college-of-art-design-animated-short-film/
http://www.afnews.info/wordpress/2016/08/05/non-solo-tecnico-non-solo-regista-semplicemente-artista-francesco-giroldini/
http://aidyreviews.net/the-monk-the-monkey-2010-review/
http://www.miaf.net/2013/MIAF13_catalogue.pdf
http://www.jazjaz.net/2010/08/the-monk-the-monkeyanimated-short-film.html
http://kinofest.com/2012/en/2012/offen/138-off-animation-1.html
http://www.ekkofilm.dk/shortlist/film/the-animation-tag-attack/
http://www.nwanimationfest.com/2014-short-films-schedule/
http://www.animanima.org/en/movie.php?action=show&id=124
https://www.filmaffinity.com/en/film776432.html
http://www.interfilm.de/en/festival2012/find-films.html?items%5Bprog%5D=1260&cHash=c9246a4eae97f74e210fe82393cabb40
http://www.3dagain.com/interviews-cg/interviews-cg-artist/212-intervista-a-francesco-giroldini-dreamworks-production-lighter.html
http://www.animest.ro/the-animation-tag-attack-1.aspx
https://athensanimfest.eu/2014/en/competition/short-competition/1/
http://www.herald.ie/entertainment/around-town/dublin-animator-hits-the-big-time-with-dreamworks-27960079.html
http://www.listal.com/list/1001-animated-shorts-you-must-233
http://www.shachindra.com/links/LISFE.html
http://404festival.com/nuevaweb/en/gallery/ata/
http://www.art-spire.com/en/3d/short-animation-film-76-the-monk-and-the-monkey/
http://blog.trikk17.com/animation/the-monk-the-monkey-brendan-carroll-francesco-giroldini/
http://kiedis.fr/2010/09/14/the-monk-the-monkey/

Italian film directors
Living people
Year of birth missing (living people)
Film people from Milan